Hygrophorus flavescens is an edible mushroom of the genus Hygrophorus found in the Pacific Northwest, eastern North America, and Texas. It is similar to Hygrophorus chlorophanus, which has a sticky coating.

References

Edible fungi
flavescens
Fungi described in 1906
Fungi of the United States
Fungi without expected TNC conservation status